Hildrun Laufer-Claus ( Claus; born 13 May 1939) is a former East German athlete. She competed in the long jump at the 1960 and 1964 Summer Olympics and finished in third and seventh place, respectively.

Claus was born in Dresden, but later moved to East Berlin. She won East German championships in the long jump in 1957–1962 and 1964, and set three world records (6.36 m and 6.40 m in 1960 and 6.42 m in 1961). She married Peter Laufer, a German Olympic pole vaulter, and at the 1964 Games competed as Hildrun Laufer-Claus. She has a degree of a landscape designer. In 1995 she was paralyzed as a result of a sports-related accident.

References

1939 births
Living people
East German female long jumpers
Olympic bronze medalists for the United Team of Germany
Athletes (track and field) at the 1960 Summer Olympics
Athletes (track and field) at the 1964 Summer Olympics
Olympic athletes of the United Team of Germany
Athletes from Dresden
Dresdner SC athletes
Medalists at the 1960 Summer Olympics
Olympic bronze medalists in athletics (track and field)